Agent-Oriented Software Engineering (AOSE) is a new software engineering paradigm that arose to apply best practice in the development of complex Multi-Agent Systems (MAS) by focusing on the use of agents, and organizations (communities) of agents as the main abstractions.  The field of Software Product Lines (SPL) covers all the software development lifecycle necessary to develop a family of products where the derivation of concrete products is made systematically and rapidly.

Commentary
With the advent of biologically inspired, pervasive, and autonomic computing, the advantages of, and necessity of, agent-based technologies and MASs has become obvious. Unfortunately, current AOSE methodologies are dedicated to developing single MASs. Clearly, many MASs will make use of significantly the
same techniques, adaptations, and approaches. The field is thus ripe for exploiting the benefits of SPL: reduced costs, improved time-to-market, etc. and enhancing agent technology in such a way that it is more industrially applicable.

Multiagent Systems Product Lines (MAS-PL) is a research field devoted to combining the two approaches: applying the SPL philosophy for building a MAS. This will afford all of the advantages of SPLs and make MAS development more practical.

References 
 Michael Winikoff and Lin Padgham.  Agent Oriented Software Engineering. Chapter 15 (pages 695-757) In G. Weiss (Ed.). Multiagent Systems. 2nd Edition. MIT Press.  (a recent survey of the field)
 Site of the MaCMAS methodology which is applying MAS-PL. http://www.macmas.org
 MAS Product Lines site: https://web.archive.org/web/20140518122645/http://mas-productlines.org/
 Joaquin Peña, Michael G. Hinchey, and Antonio Ruiz-Cortés. Multiagent system product lines: Challenges and benefits. Communications of the ACM, December 2006, volume 49, issue number 12. 
 
 Joaquin Peña, Michael G. Hinchey, Antonio Ruiz-Cortés, and Pablo Trinidad. Building the Core Architecture of a NASA Multiagent System Product Line. In 7th International Workshop on Agent Oriented Software Engineering 2006, page to be published, Hakodate, Japan, May 2006. LNCS. https://doi.org/10.1007%2F978-3-540-70945-9_13
 Joaquin Peña, Michael G. Hinchey, Manuel Resinas, Roy Sterritt, James L. Rash. Managing the Evolution of an Enterprise Architecture using a MAS-Product-Line Approach. 5th Int. Workshop on System/Software Architectures (IWSSA’06). Nevada, USA. 2006
 Soe-Tsyr Yuan. MAS Building Environments with Product-Line-Architecture Awareness.
 Josh_Dehlinger and Robyn R. Lutz have several publications in this field.
 MAS-PL -- Current research. In THE FOURTH TECHNICAL FORUM (TF4) of AgentLink. December 2006.

Software project management